Maruszyna  is a village in the administrative district of Gmina Szaflary, within Nowy Targ County, Lesser Poland Voivodeship, in southern Poland.

References

Villages in Nowy Targ County